Friedrichswalde may refer to the following places in Germany:

Friedrichswalde, a municipality in the Barnim district, Brandenburg
Friedrichswalde (Königsberg), former quarter of Königsberg, Prussia
A part of Sternberg, Mecklenburg-Vorpommern, in the Parchim district
A part of Bahretal, in the Sächsische Schweiz district, Saxony

Elsewhere:
Tarnma, South Australia was known as Friedrichswalde until 1919